Match officials for the 2006 FIFA World Cup were nominated by the six confederations to FIFA, who, after a series of tests in Frankfurt/Neu-Isenburg in March 2006, selected 23 referees and a support and development group of a further 5, from a shortlist of 44.

Kyros Vassaras of Greece and Manuel Mejuto of Spain were selected to be on the panel, but the assistants who were to make up their teams were not deemed to have reached the required standards, and so they were replaced by Roberto Rosetti and Luis Medina. Jamaican referee Peter Prendergast was selected for the tournament panel, but suffered a knee injury and was removed from the list without replacement. Massimo De Santis of Italy was also on the panel of 23 referees, but after he was implicated in the Serie A match-fixing allegations, he was withdrawn by the Italian Football Federation and not replaced.

The 21 referees, along with their assistants and the support group, are based in Neu-Isenburg for the duration of the tournament. FIFA announces the referees selected for each fixture three days in advance of the match. 

Horacio Elizondo was chosen to officiate the final match, which took place in Berlin on July 9.

Refereeing teams
Below are the details of the 21 groups of match officials in the 2006 FIFA World Cup. For assistants, a flag is only shown if his nationality varies from that of the referee with whom he is grouped.

Most teams (consisting of a referee and two assistants) are drawn from the same nation, and all are made up of officials from the same confederation. In the first round of the tournament, officials other than from UEFA member associations only operate in groups that do not include a representative of their confederation.

Mexico is the only country with 2 referees on the panel.

For the first time at a World Cup, match officials will be equipped with microphones and earpieces so they can communicate better with each other during each game. Furthermore this World Cup sees the introduction of a fifth official who can be called upon to replace an injured assistant referee. The fourth official would replace the referee..

Support officials
Five teams of officials were named to be on standby in the case of injury to any of the officials nominated for a match. None of them were called upon, however, and from the quarter-finals onwards, referees from among the 12 retained for the latter stages of the tournament were given standby appointments to matches.

Final Match Officials

On Wednesday 28th of June, one day after the Second Round matches were completed and two days before the Quarterfinals, the FIFA announced the 12 referees that were retained for the remaining matches. This is the standard process, meant to ensure only the best referees are in charge of the final few games.  The twelve are:

Toru Kamikawa (Japan)
Coffi Codjia (Benin)
Benito Archundia (Mexico)
Horacio Elizondo (Argentina)
Jorge Larrionda (Uruguay)
Mark Shield (Australia)
Massimo Busacca (Switzerland)
Frank De Bleeckere (Belgium)
Luis Medina Cantalejo (Spain)
Markus Merk (Germany)
Ľuboš Micheľ (Slovakia)
Roberto Rosetti (Italy)

See also
2006 FIFA World Cup disciplinary record
2010 FIFA World Cup officials

External links
 Referee Ratings for the 2006 FIFA World Cup

References

Officials